Barbados is a sovereign island country in the Lesser Antilles, in the Caribbean. Despite being classified as an Atlantic island, Barbados is considered to be a part of the Caribbean, where it is ranked as a leading tourist destination. Forty percent of the tourists come from the UK, with the US and Canada making up the next large groups of visitors to the island.  The Government of Barbados also owns a handful of state-owned companies some of which are outlined below.

Notable firms 
This list includes notable companies with primary headquarters located in the country. The industry and sector follow the Industry Classification Benchmark taxonomy. Organizations which have ceased operations are included and noted as defunct.

References 

Barbados